Szczecin Airport may refer to:

Szczecin-Goleniów "Solidarność" Airport, a major airport serving Szczecin, situated near Goleniów, in Poland (IATA: SZZ)
Szczecin-Dąbie Airport, a small sport aviation airport in Szczecin proper
Szczecin-Lotnisko, a municipal neighbourhood of Szczecin